Clemson Island Prehistoric District is a historic archaeological site and national historic district located at Halifax Township, Dauphin County, Pennsylvania.  It is a series of three spatially discrete loci.  They constitute a transitional Middle Woodland - Late Woodland (c. 900-1100 A.D.) earthwork mound and associated village. There is evidence of occupation from the Early Archaic period (c. 6,900 B.C.) to the 18th century.  The mound was excavated in May and June 1929.

It was added to the National Register of Historic Places in 1981. The 123-acre island is accessible only by boat. It has been owned by the state of Pennsylvania since 1965 and managed as a wildlife preserve and improvement area.

References

Archaeological sites on the National Register of Historic Places in Pennsylvania
Historic districts on the National Register of Historic Places in Pennsylvania
Historic districts in Dauphin County, Pennsylvania
National Register of Historic Places in Dauphin County, Pennsylvania